Periconiella is a genus of ascomycete fungi. It was defined by the Italian mycologist Pier Andrea Saccardo in 1885.

References

External links 

Ascomycota enigmatic taxa